is a Japanese stew (a type of nabemono or one-pot dish) commonly eaten in vast quantity by sumo wrestlers as part of a weight-gain diet.

Ingredients and consumption
The dish contains a dashi or chicken broth soup base with sake or mirin to add flavor. The dish is not made according to a fixed recipe and often contains whatever is available to the cook; the bulk is made up of large quantities of protein sources such as chicken (quartered, skin left on), fish (fried and made into balls), tofu, or sometimes beef, and vegetables (daikon, bok choy, etc.).

While considered a reasonably healthy dish in its own right, chankonabe is very protein-rich and usually served in massive quantities, with beer and rice to increase the caloric intake. Leftover chankonabe broth can also later be used as broth for sōmen or udon noodles.

Chankonabe is traditionally served according to seniority, with the senior wrestlers and any guests of the sumo stable receiving first choice, and the junior wrestlers getting whatever is left.

Origin and customs
Chankonabe is also a popular restaurant food, often served in restaurants operated by retired sumo wrestlers who specialize in the dish; the first of these, Kawasaki Chanko, was started in 1937 in the Ryōgoku district of Tokyo, home to many prominent sumo stables.

Chankonabe served during sumo tournaments is made exclusively with chicken, the idea being that a wrestler should always be on two legs like a chicken, not all fours.

See also
Glossary of sumo terms
 List of Japanese soups and stews
Nabemono

References

Japanese soups and stews
Sumo terminology